Peter S. Julian  (born April 16, 1962) is a Canadian Member of Parliament for the New Democratic Party (NDP), representing the riding of New Westminster—Burnaby.

Personal life
Julian was born on April 16, 1962, in New Westminster, British Columbia, to Terry and Ruth Julian. His father Terry was a school administrator, historian and author, and a 2002 recipient of the Queen's Jubilee Medal. He has a sister, Randi, and a brother, Patrick.

Prior to his political career, Julian worked in a variety of settings, including as a financial administrator, and as a manual labourer at an oil refinery, factories and various small businesses.

Julian is fluently bilingual in the English and French languages and is also functional in American Sign Language. He lives in the 10th Avenue area of New Westminster. He graduated from New Westminster Secondary School and holds a bachelor's degree in political science from the Université du Québec à Montréal with a specialization in International Relations.

Political career
In 2002, Julian ran for the City Council in New Westminster, British Columbia. He received 3,275 votes, losing a spot on the council by 74 votes.

After losing his bid for city council, Julian ran for the New Democratic Party nomination in the riding of Burnaby—New Westminster, British Columbia. On March 7, 2004, Julian defeated Dave Mackinon to be the NDP's candidate in the 2004 federal election. Julian won the general election, defeating Mary Pynenburg of the Liberal Party of Canada by just 329 votes. He was re-elected by 3,971 votes over Pynenburg in 2006. In the federal election held on October 14, 2008, Julian won the riding of Burnaby—New Westminster by over 6,900 votes. Julian won the riding again in 2011 with 49.67% of the votes.

He also co-founded the Save St. Mary's Hospital Community Coalition. He was a founding member of the BC Disability Employment Network and the Burnaby-New Westminster Council of Canadians. He has also volunteered for the local Emergency Social Services, for Royal City Soccer, East Burnaby Minor Baseball, the United Way, and the United Church of Canada.

In the New Democratic Party Shadow Cabinet, Julian was the Energy and Natural Resources Critic. Julian previously served as the NDP critic for International Trade, Transportation, Persons with Disabilities, Treasury Board, Western Fisheries Critic, Industry, and the 2010 Vancouver-Whistler Olympics. Julian also served as the Deputy NDP Caucus Chair. During the 2011–12 NDP leadership race, Julian took over from candidate Peggy Nash to serve as the NDP's Finance Critic until the race was over, at which point Nash retook her spot and Julian was shifted to the lower-profile position of Energy Critic.

Julian vocally opposed the Security and Prosperity Partnership (SPP) that he believed threatened Canada's sovereignty through deep integration with the United States and Mexico. As NDP Transport Critic, Julian led the successful fight in the House of Commons to stop the SMS transport safety bill, which he believed to be an attempt to turn safety over to air transport companies themselves, something Julian termed "self-serve safety".  Julian also initiated an NDP task force to meet and consult with diverse Canadian immigrant communities across the country, and to learn more about the challenges they face.

The Georgia Straight newspaper has called Julian "one of the region's hardest working politicians". Julian ranked 3rd of 308 MPs in the 39th Parliament on bills, votes, and speeches.

Amid the NDP's third-place performance in the 2015 federal election, Julian was re-elected. Party leader Tom Mulcair appointed him to continue serving as NDP House Leader.

On December 21, 2016, Julian registered to run in the NDP leadership race to succeed Tom Mulcair. He withdrew on July 5, 2017, after trailing fellow candidates Charlie Angus, Niki Ashton, Guy Caron, and Jagmeet Singh in fundraising. He subsequently endorsed Singh for leader.

On January 31, 2018, Peter Julian was named finance critic in the NDP shadow cabinet by party leader Jagmeet Singh. In addition, Julian was made House Leader of the NDP and energy critic on March 14, 2019.

Committees
Canadian House of Commons Standing Committee on International Trade

Electoral record

Federal

Provincial

Municipal

References

External links
Peter Julian

1962 births
Canadian activists
Living people
Members of the House of Commons of Canada from British Columbia
Members of the United Church of Canada
New Democratic Party MPs
People from New Westminster
Université du Québec à Montréal alumni
New Democratic Party of Quebec candidates in Quebec provincial elections
21st-century Canadian politicians